The Ruoff Music Center (originally Deer Creek Music Center and formerly Verizon Wireless Music Center, Klipsch Music Center, and Ruoff Home Mortgage Music Center) is an outdoor amphitheatre located in Noblesville, Indiana. It is the largest outdoor music venue in the Indianapolis metropolitan area of central Indiana, with 6,147 seats under a pavilion and 18,000 general admission lawn seats. It is used mainly for large concerts, but is also frequently a host for high school graduations and political rallies.

Concerts and music festivals
The Ruoff Music Center is an open-air concert venue capable of hosting live, high-profile concerts and outdoor music festivals. It opened in 1989, at a site along Sand Creek, just north of exit 210 on Interstate 69, near the junction of former State Road 238 (at the time also known as Greenfield Avenue; now rebuilt and renamed as Southeastern Parkway), 146th Street and Boden Road. In 1997, Sunshine Promotions, which built the amphitheater, was acquired by SFX; corporate successor Live Nation Entertainment continues to own it. On December 19, 2018, Pollstar, a trade publication for the concert industry, ranked the center as the world's top concert amphitheater based on annual ticket sales in 2018. During the previous year, the venue ranked third among the list of the world's top concert amphitheaters. In 2021, the venue ranked second on the same list.

2006–2007: Possible sale
In 2011, Klipsch Group, Inc., whose international headquarters are located nearby, acquired naming rights to the venue. The venue remained under the ownership of Live Nation and continued to draw major acts during the summer months.

2017: Naming rights change 
On September 27, 2017, Live Nation announced that the music center had acquired a new naming rights sponsor from Ruoff Home Mortgage after the previous 5-year contract with Klipsch expired in 2016 and left the venue without a title sponsor for a year. The venue officially became the Ruoff Home Mortgage Music Center simultaneously with the announcement. On December 5, 2019, it was announced that the name of the music center would be shortened to Ruoff Music Center.

See also
Live Nation
List of contemporary amphitheatres

References

External links

Official website

Amphitheaters in the United States
Buildings and structures in Hamilton County, Indiana
Tourist attractions in Hamilton County, Indiana
Music venues in Indiana